Major  Bevil Bryan Quiller-Couch  MC (12 October 1890 – 6 February 1919) was a decorated  British Army officer who served continuously in Flanders and France from August 1914 to 1918. He was the son of the Cornish writer, Sir Arthur Quiller-Couch of Fowey, Cornwall. He was engaged to the war poet, May Wedderburn Cannan, but he died before they could be married. A book of his letters was published in 2002. The book was also made into a radio play by the BBC.

Education
He attended Trinity College, Oxford in 1908 where he was captain of his College VIII rowing crew. He won the University Pairs in 1912 and 1913. He also rowed in the final for the Goblets at the Henley Royal Regatta. While he was at Oxford, he joined the Officer Training Corps and joined the Special Reserve.

War service
His war service started in August 1914 where he served with the Royal Field Artillery at Mons and Aisne. He was involved in the transportation of ammunition to the gun batteries. He saw action at the First Battle of Ypres. He later saw action at Festubert and in May 1915 he was the Orderly Officer responsible for writing the regimental war diary. By 1916, he was on the Somme and in August that year he was promoted to acting major. In September 1917, he was wounded during the Third Battle of Ypres. He was later involved at Cambrai and, by January 1918, went on leave back to England. Towards the end of the war, Quiller-Couch led his battery into action at Noyelles. He last saw action in November 1918 before joining the reserve forces at Villers Pol.

Citation

Death
Quiller-Couch survived the war only to die at Langerwehe, near Düren in Germany, on 6 February 1919 during the Spanish flu pandemic. He was buried in the Southern Cemetery at Cologne in Germany. Although he died after the end of the war, his name is recorded on the war memorial at Fowey Church.

Legacy
A book by Charlotte Pullein-Thompson called The Tears of War was published in 2000 by Cavalier Books. It is a compilation of Quiller-Couch's love letters sent to his fiancée and poems she sent to him. In 2002, BBC Radio 4 presented a dramatised version of The Tears of War as the afternoon play on Armistice Day. The part of Quiller-Couch was played by the actor James Purefoy.

References

1890 births
1919 deaths
British Army personnel of World War I
Recipients of the Military Cross
Royal Field Artillery officers
Deaths from Spanish flu
Alumni of Trinity College, Cambridge
People from Fowey
People educated at Winchester College
British letter writers
20th-century letter writers